Tonight the Stars Revolt! is the second major label studio album by American rock band Powerman 5000. It was released on July 20, 1999 by DreamWorks Records. Having sold over one million copies and achieving platinum status, this would become the group's most successful release and featured such hits as "Nobody's Real" and "When Worlds Collide".

Album information
Although it doesn't tell a specific story, the songs have a cohesive theme, primarily oriented around campy Atomic Age science fiction reminiscent of the 1950s, coupled with nihilistic, apocalyptic messages and paranoid, cyberpunk imagery.

Music critics and fans alike compare Powerman 5000 frontman Spider One's fixation on bygone science fiction with older brother Rob Zombie's obsession with B-movie horror themes.  Both seem to share an affection for campy entertainment that influence their musical output, though Spider has since abandoned science fiction as the inspiration for Powerman 5000's sound and image. The CD booklet of Tonight the Stars Revolt! is also composed with science fiction imagery and text, similar to Zombie's horror-themed Hellbilly Deluxe, released the year prior.

Musically, the album bears similarity to Rob Zombie's industrial metal sound with catchy riffs and electronic elements. However, it also includes a cover of The Cars' "Good Times Roll" and "Watch the Sky for Me", a moody, lounge song with its entire melody taken from the track "One More Kiss, Dear" by Vangelis for the Blade Runner soundtrack. 

The album shares the same title as a story by Gardner Fox published in the pulp science fiction magazine Planet Stories (1952).

Reception

CMJ (July 19, 1999, p. 3) – "...tighter than a barbed wire noose wrapped around your neck...[TONIGHT] relies on sci-fi imagery and memorable hooks that are sharp enough to catch more than a few big, heavy fish".

Awards
The album won the Boston Music Awards for "Album of the Year" in 2000, while "When Worlds Collide" was nominated for "Single of the Year".

Media appearances
 "When Worlds Collide" featured in Tony Hawk's Pro Skater 2, Tony Hawk’s Pro Skater HD, and Tony Hawk's Pro Skater 1 + 2. It also served as the theme song to WWE SmackDown! vs. RAW and featured on the Little Nicky soundtrack, Free Air, Vol. 2, and MTV The Return of the Rock.
 "Nobody's Real" featured on the End of Days soundtrack, Gravity Games 2000: Summer Sounds, Vol. 1, and Naked 4-Play as a live rendition.
 "The Son of X-51" (Remix) featured exclusively on the Bride of Chucky soundtrack.
 "Supernova Goes Pop" featured on the Universal Soldier: The Return soundtrack and Gran Turismo 3.
 "Tonight the Stars Revolt!" featured on the Blade II soundtrack.

Track listing
All lyrics by Spider One; all music by Powerman 5000, except "Good Times Roll" by The Cars.

 The song "Watch the Sky for Me" ends at minute 3:50. After 30 seconds of silence (3:50–4:20), the hidden track "The World of the Dead" starts.

Personnel
 Spider One – vocals
 Adam 12 – guitar
 M.33 – guitar
 Dorian 27 – bass
 Al 3 – drums

Production
 Chapman Baehler – photography
 Tom Baker – mastering
 Joe Barresi – engineer
 Ginger Fish – piano
 Frank Gryner – mixing
 Scott Humphrey – programming, mixing
 Sylvia Massy – producer, engineer
 Marc LaCorte – programming
 DJ Lethal – turntables
 Spider One – art direction, design
 Nika – art direction, design
 Malachi Throne – narrator
 Ulrich Wild – producer, mixing
 Rob Zombie – vocals 
 Ron Handler – A&R

Charts

Weekly charts

Year-end charts

Singles

References

Powerman 5000 albums
1999 albums
Albums produced by Ulrich Wild
Nu metal albums by American artists
Industrial metal albums
Cyberpunk music
DreamWorks Records albums